Gnathophis macroporis, the largepore conger, is an eel in the family Congridae (conger/garden eels). It was described by Emma Stanislavovna Karmovskaya and John Richard Paxton in 2000. It is a marine, temperate water-dwelling eel which is known from Victoria, Australia, in the eastern Indian Ocean. It is known to dwell at a depth of 164 metres.

References

macroporis
Taxa named by Emma Stanislavovna Karmovskaya
Taxa named by John Richard Paxton
Fish described in 2000